Insalebria is a genus of snout moths described by Filipjev in 1924.

Species
 Insalebria concineratella (Ragonot, 1887)
 Insalebria kozhantshikovi Filipjev, 1924
 Insalebria serraticornella (Zeller, 1839)

References

Phycitinae